A Casual Introduction 1981/2001 is an album by Scottish musician Edwyn Collins. It is a collection of both his solo work and also work of Orange Juice, the band he fronted from 1979 to the mid-80s.

The 'Intermediate Mix' of "Rip It Up" is a mixture of the original version and the 12" release, only available on this compilation. "The Witch Queen of New Orleans" is also only available on this album and is, therefore, the only version.

It was released in 2003.

Track listing

References

2003 compilation albums
Edwyn Collins albums
Setanta Records compilation albums